McClendon is a surname.

Notable people with the surname "McClendon" include

Aubrey McClendon (born 1959), chief executive officer, chairman, and co-founder of Chesapeake Energy
Brian McClendon (born 1964), inventor of Google Earth
Bryan McClendon (born 1983), college football running backs coach for the University of Georgia Bulldogs
Charles McClendon (1923–2001), LSU head football coach in the 1960s and the 1970s
James William McClendon, Jr. (1924–2000), Christian theologian in the Anabaptist tradition
Jesse Francis McClendon (1880–1976), American chemist, zoologist and physiologist
Lloyd McClendon (born 1959), American baseball player and manager
Reiley McClendon (born 1990), American actor
Rose McClendon (1884–1936), African American Broadway actress of the 1920s
Ruth McClendon (1943–2017), American politician
Sarah McClendon (1910–2003), long-time White House reporter who covered presidential politics for a half-century
Skip McClendon (born 1964), American football player
Warren McClendon (born 2001), American football player
Willie McClendon (born 1957), American football player

People with the given name "McClendon" include
McClendon Curtis (born 1999), American football player

See also
McClendon-McDougald Gymnasium, 3,056-seat multi-purpose arena in Durham, North Carolina